Vollies is a Canadian television comedy series, which premiered in 2021 on Bell Fibe's TV1. The series centres on the Essex-West-Essex Fire Department, a smalltown volunteer fire department with too much time on their hands because their town never has any actual fires to fight.

The series stars Jonathan Torrens, Sarah McCarthy, Alicia McCarvell, Edwina Govindsamy, Mary Austin, Brian George and James Faulkner. It was created by Torrens and McCarthy, and written by Torrens, McCarthy, Sylvia Beirnes and Mark Forward. It was shot in and around the Truro, Nova Scotia, area in spring 2021.

In October 2021, Vollies was renewed for a second season, which will begin filming in the spring of 2022.

Torrens received a Canadian Screen Award nomination for Best Supporting Actor in a Comedy Series at the 10th Canadian Screen Awards in 2022.

Episodes

References

External links

2020s Canadian sitcoms
2021 Canadian television series debuts
Television shows filmed in Nova Scotia
Canadian community channel television shows